The Crepori National Forest is a national forest in the state of Pará, Brazil. It is home to rich biodiversity including several endangered animal species.

Location

The Crepori National Forest is in the municipality of Jacareacanga, Pará.
It adjoins the Tapajós Environmental Protection Area to the north and east and the Mundurucu Indigenous Territory to the west.
The northernmost part of the forest is in the Southern Pará Peripheral Depression, the central and eastern part in the Tapajós Residual Plateau and the southern and southwestern parts in the Amazon Lower Plateau domain.

History

The Crepori National Forest was created by federal decree on 13 February 2006 with the objectives of promoting sustainable multiple use of forest resources, maintenance and protection of water resources and biodiversity, and development of methods for sustainable exploitation of natural resources.
Mining is allowed in specified areas.
The park is administered by the Chico Mendes Institute for Biodiversity Conservation.
It is classed as IUCN protected area category VI (protected area with sustainable use of natural resources).

The consultative council was created on 14 May 2009.
On 17 November 2009 a working group was created to coordinate preparation of management tools for the Amaná, Crepori, Altamira, Jamanxim, Trairão, Itaituba I and Itaituba II national forests in the state of Pará.
The management plan was approved on 10 March 2010.

Law 12678 of 25 June 2012 amended the limits of the Amazônia, Campos Amazônicos and Mapinguari national parks, the Itaituba I, Itaituba II and Crepori national forests and the Tapajós Environmental Protection Area.
All were reduced in size except the Campos Amazônicos National Park.

Environment

Soil types include red-yellow acrisols (40.77% of the area), yellow latosols (32.89%) and red-yellow latosols (18.38%.

Vegetation is about 88% dense rainforest and just over 11% open rainforest.
The flora is highly diverse.
A total of 231 taxa of species or morphospecies have been identified in 40 botanical families.
The families with the most species were Orchidaceae (38), Araceae (34), Arecaceae (29), Rubiaceae (11), Marantaceae (10) and Bromeliaceae (9). 
These families account for 56.27% of all taxa recorded in the forest.
Many of the taxa are widely distributed, but some are very restricted to specific environments.
Rare species include the Bromeliaceae Fosteella batistana and an unnamed species of Arecaceae, both of which occur in alluvial forest.
An unidentified species of Bromeliaceae of the genus Aechmea has been found in only one place in the forest.

The forest is home to species endemic to the Amazon basin such as the Amazon river dolphin (Inia geoffrensis) and tucuxi (Sotalia fluviatilis), and to the white-cheeked spider monkey (Ateles marginatus) and white-nosed saki (Chiropotes albinasus), primates whose presence in the Tapajós basin was not certain until their presence was reported in the forest. Bird species endemic to the forest include the dark-winged trumpeter (Psophia viridis), Gould's toucanet (Selenidera gouldii) and lettered aracari (Pteroglossus inscriptus).

Notes

Sources

Further reading

National forests of Brazil
Protected areas established in 2006
2006 establishments in Brazil
Protected areas of Pará